The Mind of Mr. Reeder is a 1939 British  mystery crime film directed by Jack Raymond and starring Will Fyffe as Mr. Reeder, with Kay Walsh, George Curzon, and supporting roles for Chili Bouchier, John Warwick and Ronald Shiner.

It was produced by Jack Raymond Productions and shot at the Highbury Studios in London, with sets designed by the art director James Carter. It was distributed in the United States by Monogram Pictures using the  alternative title The Mysterious Mr. Reeder. Also, Ronald Shiner, Will Fyffe and Jack Raymond were all involved in another Mr. Reeder film The Missing People. The film is based on a 1925 collection of short stories by Edgar Wallace.

Plot
Reeder, an employee of the Public Prospectors Department, pursues a gang of counterfeiters.

Cast
 Will Fyffe as J.G. Reeder 
 Kay Walsh as Peggy Gillette 
 George Curzon as Welford 
 Chili Bouchier as Elsa Weford 
 John Warwick as Ted Bracher 
 Lesley Wareing as Mrs. Gaylor 
 Romilly Lunge as Inspector Gaylor 
 Betty Astell as Barmaid 
 Derek Gorst as Langdon 
 Ronald Shiner as Sam Hackett 
 Wally Patch as Lomer 
 George Hayes as Brady
 Patricia Roc as Doris Bevan

References

Bibliography
 Slide, Anthony. Banned in the U.S.A.: British Films in the United States and Their Censorship, 1933-1966. I.B.Tauris, 1998.

External links
 
 
 

1939 films
1939 crime films
British black-and-white films
British crime films
British mystery films
1930s English-language films
Films directed by Jack Raymond
Films based on British novels
Films based on works by Edgar Wallace
1939 mystery films
Films shot at Highbury Studios
Films set in London
Films scored by Percival Mackey
1930s British films